Juan Ignacio Méndez (born 28 April 1997) is an Argentine professional footballer who plays as a midfielder for San Lorenzo.

Career

Club
Méndez began in the youth system of Andes Talleres in 2005, where he spent seven years, trialling at Boca Juniors in 2009, before joining the ranks of Argentinos Juniors in 2012. He first appeared in the Argentinos first-team on 8 July 2017 for a Primera B Nacional match with Gimnasia y Esgrima, but he was an unused substitute. On 12 July, Méndez made his professional debut in the same competition versus Nueva Chicago. Another appearance followed in 2016–17 as Argentinos won the title and therefore promotion to the 2017–18 Primera División. In January 2019, Méndez joined Talleres as part of a deal involving Carlos Quintana.

International
Méndez was called up to Argentina's squad for the 2017 FIFA U-20 World Cup in South Korea as an injury replacement for Ezequiel Barco. However, he failed to feature in a match as Argentina were eliminated at the group stage.

Personal life
From his grandmother, he is of Chilean descent.

Career statistics
.

Honours
Argentinos Juniors
Primera B Nacional: 2016–17

References

External links

1997 births
Living people
Sportspeople from Mendoza Province
Argentine sportspeople of Chilean descent
Argentine footballers
Association football midfielders
Primera Nacional players
Argentine Primera División players
Argentinos Juniors footballers
Talleres de Córdoba footballers
San Lorenzo de Almagro footballers